Victor Christopher Ferkiss (1925–2020) was Professor Emeritus of Government, Georgetown University. His 1971 book Technological Man was a sciences finalist for the National Book Award.

Bibliography
 Technological Man (1971)
 The Future of Technological Civilization (1974)
 Nature, technology, and Society (1994)

References

2020 deaths
20th-century American historians
American male non-fiction writers
1925 births
20th-century American male writers
Historians of technology